The 2016 WWE draft was a professional wrestling event and the tenth WWE draft, the first since 2011, produced by the American professional wrestling promotion WWE between the Raw and SmackDown brands. It took place on July 19 during the live premiere of SmackDown on the USA Network in the United States broadcasting from the DCU Center in Worcester, Massachusetts.

Background 
In 2002, following the acquisition of the remains of World Championship Wrestling and Extreme Championship Wrestling, the then-World Wrestling Federation (WWF, now WWE) introduced the brand split, dividing its roster among two brands, Raw and SmackDown, represented by the shows of the same name. The brand split would continue until 2011, with a draft held every year (except 2003) to refresh the brands' rosters. In August 2011, the brand split ended, allowing all WWE wrestlers to appear on both shows.

In mid-2016, with a larger roster of wrestlers, in part thanks to WWE's developmental brand NXT, WWE decided to reintroduce the brand split with a draft to be held on the July 19 episode of SmackDown – the show's debut broadcast on the USA Network, as well as its renaming to SmackDown Live (with the show now broadcasting live as it was previously aired on tape delay). On the July 11 episode of Monday Night Raw, WWE Chairman and Chief Executive Officer Vince McMahon appointed Shane McMahon as the commissioner of SmackDown and Stephanie McMahon as the commissioner of Raw. The following week, the commissioners introduced Mick Foley and Daniel Bryan as the general managers of Raw and SmackDown, respectively.

The rules of the draft were posted to WWE's website on July 17. They were the following:
 Raw received the first overall draft pick.
 For every two draft picks for SmackDown, Raw received three picks (due to Raw being a three-hour show, while SmackDown is two hours).
 Tag teams counted as one pick unless a commissioner/general manager specifically only wanted a single member from the team as their pick.
 Six draft picks had to be made from the NXT roster; title holders could not be picked.

Results
In addition to the televised draft, the live episode of SmackDown also featured several matches.

Selection

SmackDown Live
The following is the list of wrestlers who were drafted on SmackDown Live.

WWE Draft Center Live
The following is the list of wrestlers who were drafted on the WWE Draft Center Live special on the WWE Network.

Undrafted
Several wrestlers remained undrafted mainly due to injury or inactivity, some of which eventually were assigned to a brand. The chart is organized by date. 

Notes
 Tag teams/stables broken up as a result of the draft were The Wyatt Family (Bray Wyatt and Erick Rowan to SmackDown, Braun Strowman to Raw; Luke Harper went undrafted due to having suffered a knee injury before the draft, but was signed by SmackDown), The Club (AJ Styles to SmackDown, Luke Gallows and Karl Anderson to Raw), and The Social Outcasts (Bo Dallas and Curtis Axel to Raw; Heath Slater went undrafted but was eventually signed by SmackDown).
 Lana, Maryse, and Bob Backlund were each drafted in the same pick as their respective clients. Dana Brooke was drafted separately from her client Charlotte, but continued to manage her for several months afterwards.
 Of the six NXT draft picks, two were made by Raw (Finn Bálor and Nia Jax), the other four were made by SmackDown (American Alpha (Jason Jordan and Chad Gable), Alexa Bliss, Mojo Rawley, and Carmella).
 After the results at Battleground, Raw was the home of three WWE titles (WWE Women's Championship, WWE Tag Team Championship, and United States Championship), while SmackDown was the home of two WWE titles (WWE Championship and Intercontinental Championship). The WWE Universal Championship was introduced for Raw on July 25, 2016; the WWE Championship was subsequently renamed to WWE World Championship (it was reverted to WWE Championship in December 2016). The WWE SmackDown Tag Team Championship and WWE SmackDown Women's Championship were unveiled on August 23, 2016; Raw's Women's and Tag Team titles were subsequently renamed to reflect their exclusivity to Raw. A new WWE Cruiserweight Championship was then unveiled for the cruiserweight division on September 14, 2016 (originally part of Raw, but made exclusive to the 205 Live brand in 2018). The WWE United Kingdom Championship was later introduced in December 2016 and awarded the following month, it was defended on NXT before the introduction of the NXT UK brand in 2018.

Response and aftermath
Following the brand extension draft, former WWE wrestlers made their return to WWE and sided with either Raw or SmackDown. Within the next month, Jinder Mahal and Brian Kendrick returned on Raw, while Rhyno and Curt Hawkins joined SmackDown. Shelton Benjamin was announced to return on SmackDown, but his return was put on hiatus due to a torn rotator cuff, which required surgery. In September, Raw draftee Jack Swagger moved to SmackDown. Various competitors from the Cruiserweight Classic also signed contracts with Raw due to being a part of the cruiserweight division. Former NXT Women's Champion Bayley joined Raw after her final match at NXT TakeOver: Brooklyn II.

On November 29, 2016, a new show called 205 Live premiered. The new show exclusively features WWE's cruiserweight division. The division was formerly exclusive to Monday Night Raw, but became shared between Raw and 205 Live until 205 Live became its own brand in 2018.

As a result of the reintroduction of the brand extension, the July 19 Draft episode (and the first live episode) of SmackDown on Tuesdays gained a viewership by 2.2 rating with 3.17 million viewers (compare to Raws rating with 3.04 million viewers on the previous night), and was SmackDowns highest rated episode since December 2010.

References

WWE Draft
WWE draft
Professional wrestling in Massachusetts
July 2016 events in the United States
Events in Massachusetts
2016 in Massachusetts
History of Worcester, Massachusetts
Events in Worcester, Massachusetts